Salix aurita, the eared willow, is a species of willow distributed over much of Europe, and occasionally cultivated. It is a shrub to 2.5 m in height, distinguished from the similar but slightly larger Salix cinerea by its reddish petioles and young twigs. It was named for its persistent kidney-shaped stipules along the shoots.

References

External links
 
 
 

aurita
Plants described in 1753
Taxa named by Carl Linnaeus